The 1879 population census in Bosnia and Herzegovina was the first census of the population of Bosnia and Herzegovina taken during the Austro-Hungarian occupation.

Results 
The number of inhabitants: 1,158,440
Population density: 22.6 per km²

Overall

References 

Censuses in Bosnia and Herzegovina
1879 in Austria-Hungary
Austro-Hungarian rule in Bosnia and Herzegovina
Bosnia and Herzegovina